Malcolm Jack Blight AM (born 16 February 1950) is a former Australian rules footballer who played for and coached the North Melbourne Football Club in the Victorian Football League (VFL) and Woodville Football Club in the South Australian National Football League (SANFL). He also coached the Geelong Football Club, Adelaide Football Club and St Kilda Football Club.

Blight is to date the only player to have kicked 100 goals in a season in both the VFL and the SANFL. He is also one of three players to have won the Brownlow Medal and the Magarey Medal. He was an inaugural inductee Australian Football Hall of Fame in 1996 and was elevated to Legend status in 2017. In addition, he has captained the state representative sides of both Victoria and South Australia.

The name Blight is of Cornish origin. In 2012, Blight was appointed director of coaching at the Gold Coast Football Club.

Football career

1968–1973: First stint at Woodville
Blight grew up supporting  living close to Alberton Oval with his favourite player at the time being forward Rex Johns. However, when a new local team Woodville began to play in the SANFL from 1964, and Blight was now in their recruiting zone and he would make his debut for the Woodpeckers in 1969. Blight had a break-out year in 1972, kicking 45 goals while playing mainly as a ruck-rover. He won Woodville's best and fairest award as well as the SANFL's highest individual honor, the Magarey Medal, bringing him to the attention of the VFL.

1974–1982: Success in Victoria with North Melbourne
Blight was recruited by the North Melbourne Football Club and, although he was reluctant to join at first, he went on to play 178 games for the club between 1974 and 1982. He was a member of the Kangaroos' premiership sides in 1975 and 1977, and in 1978 won both the Brownlow Medal and the Syd Barker Medal for being the best and fairest player in the VFL and for North Melbourne respectively.

Blight was consistently one of the most brilliant players in the VFL during the 1970s. Besides taking spectacular marks, he was also a prolific goalkicker, renowned for his ability to kick the torpedo punt. In 1982, Blight won the Coleman Medal for leading the VFL in goalkicking, and led the Kangaroos' goalkicking four times during his career.

Eighty-metre goal after the siren

In a moment that has since passed into Australian rules football folklore, in 1976, Blight kicked a famous goal after the siren against Carlton in Round 10 (5 June). The Blues led by 14 points going into added time in the final quarter, but Blight kicked two goals and then marked an estimated 80 metres from the goals just seconds before the final siren. North Melbourne were still trailing by one point, needing a behind to draw and a goal to win. Many assumed Blight's effort would be futile and spectators were already exiting the playing arena. However, Blight kicked one of the biggest-ever torpedo punts, with the ball going over the goals but between the posts to an improbable victory for the Kangaroos by 11.15 (81) to Carlton's 11.10 (76). (YouTube video)

This moment was the focus of a television commercial in the Toyota Legendary Moments series which featured Blight. (YouTube video)

Infamous moments
During the 1977 VFL season, which happened to be played during the wettest Melbourne winter in 40 years,  hosted  at Arden Street. The ground conditions were atrocious, and the match for the most part resembled something more akin to mud wrestling. Hawthorn led by one point when Blight was given a free kick and a set shot for goal. He scored a behind, which would have levelled the scores, but was given a second attempt after the umpire penalized Hawthorn for an infringement. Unfortunately for Blight and North Melbourne, the ball slew off the side of his boot and went out of bounds on the full, giving the Hawks victory. In the drawn Grand Final, he was benched by Barassi after three quarters, but kept his place in the team for the replay and went on to be one of their best players in the win.

Blight won the 1978 Brownlow Medal, but unfortunately suffered a groin injury in the early minutes of the 1978 VFL Grand Final against Hawthorn.

In 1981, while still serving as playing coach, Blight made one of the most bizarre blunders ever seen in a football match. In North Melbourne's Round 14 clash against  at the MCG, Blight was on the end of a chain of handpasses deep in the forward zone. He seemed certain to score a goal as he ran into the goal square, only to run past the goal posts and kick the ball through the behinds. As he said after the match when he realised his mistake: "I've never done that before. I'm probably going barmy." Richmond won that match by 43 points, and less than a month later, after six consecutive losses, Blight was sacked as playing coach. Freed of the coaching burden, he then kicked 11 goals against .

Blight was indirectly involved in another infamous football incident during the 1980 Escort Cup grand final against Collingwood, held at VFL Park, Waverley. Blight kicked the ball to Kerry Good as the siren sounded. However, the umpire did not hear the siren and awarded the mark to Good who kicked the winning goal to win in controversial circumstances.

1983–1985: Return to Woodville
After his stint in the VFL, Blight returned to Woodville, serving as captain-coach from 1983 to 1985 before continuing as non-playing coach in 1986 and 1987. He was club best and fairest in 1983 and in his last season of playing football (1985) topped the league goalkicking list with 126 goals.

Other matches
Blight also played 14 interstate/State of Origin football matches (seven for South Australia and seven for Victoria), kicking 25 goals, as well as 11 pre-season/night series matches for Woodville, kicking 17 goals, and 17 pre-season/night series matches for North Melbourne, kicking 37 goals (these are counted as senior by the SANFL but not the VFL/AFL). 

If these are included, Blight played a total of 372 senior career games and kicked a senior career total of 865 goals.

Coaching and after coaching
Blight later became a successful coach famous for employing unorthodox, and at times controversial, coaching methods as attempts to motivate his players.

Playing coach at North Melbourne
Appointed playing coach in 1981 after Ron Barassi departed, Blight was sacked as coach after six consecutive losses. The following week he rebounded with a club-record 11 goal haul against Footscray, at the Western Oval. Once again, Blight's inaccurate kicking for goal may have prevented him from kicking a club record of a possible 16 to 17 goals. Blight's total as playing coach (Wayne Schimmelbusch was captain) was 16 games (6 wins, 10 losses) and the last of the playing coaches in the VFL.

Back at Woodville
Playing coach 1983 to 1985, continued as non-playing coach to 1987. His tenure as coach coincided with the club's most successful season (1986) in the entire history of the Woodville Football Club, when they reached the Preliminary Final. During the season the Warriors (who had changed from being known as the Woodpeckers to the Warriors in 1983) had defeated their hated "big brother" Port Adelaide once during the minor round at Woodville Oval (drawing the oval's ground record attendance of 11,026 to their Round 18 clash), and also in the First Semi-final at Football Park, before going down to eventual premiers Glenelg in the Preliminary Final.

Geelong Football Club senior coach (1989-1994): High-Voltage Football, September Disappointment
In Blight's first year at Geelong, he guided them to the 1989 Grand Final but fell short to Hawthorn by six points. In the 1990 season, Geelong under Blight finished tenth on the ladder with eight wins and fourteen losses, missing out of the finals. In the 1991 season, Blight guided Geelong to finish third on the ladder, but were eliminated in the Preliminary Final by West Coast Eagles. Blight guided Geelong again to the Grand Final in 1992 but fell short again to West Coast Eagles by twenty-eight points. In the 1993 season, Blight guided Geelong to finish seventh on the ladder with twelve wins and eight losses, just missing out of the finals.

The Cats players warmed to his all-out attack philosophy, to such an extent that they broke the record for aggregate points in a home-and-away season (2916), which would again be broken in 1992 when they became the first (and so far only) team to score an aggregate of 3000 points in a home-and-away season. In the semi-final against , aware that the Demons intended to put a hard tag on their classy midfielders Paul Couch and Mark Bairstow, Blight started them on the interchange bench, and Geelong ended up winning by 63 points.

In an interview with Gerard Whateley in 2019, Blight opened up about the day he knew his time as Geelong coach was finished. In Round 12 of the 1994 AFL season, Geelong were hosting  at Kardinia Park, and at last break the unfancied Saints held a 26-point lead after kicking seven goals to none in the third quarter. The frustrated home fans directed their displeasure at Blight, booing and heckling him as he made his way down to the huddle. Although he made light of this to his assistant coach and soon-to-be successor Gary Ayres by remarking "I told you, the Geelong people don’t like you Hawthorn people", Blight was stung inwardly by the negative reception. Fortunately for the home side, star forward Gary Ablett kicked four of his seven goals as Geelong came from behind to win by three points.

One of the strangest incidents as a coach of Geelong was his extroverted decision to stand on a metal box to watch the game against the West Coast Eagles in Perth. His excitement of "seeing the game at ground level", was an attempt to get back to basics and some nostalgia.

Blight coached Geelong Football Club from 1989-1994 to a total of 145 games with 89 wins and 56 losses with a winning percentage of 61 percent.

Adelaide Football Club senior coach (1997-1999) : Premiership success
Blight's then made his arrival at the Crows at the end of the 1996 season, when he replaced Robert Shaw as senior coach of Adelaide Football Club. This was marked with dramatic effect, with the delisting of four ageing club stalwarts Tony McGuinness, Chris McDermott, Andrew Jarman and Greg Anderson. This attracted great criticism at the time, but Blight was vindicated, when Adelaide Football Club under Blight won the AFL premiership in 1997, and again in 1998 for the second consecutive year in a row. Blight resigned as Adelaide Football Club senior coach at the end of the 1999 season after an unsuccessful year finishing 13th. In 74 games under Blight, Adelaide won 41 games and 33 losses bringing a winning percentage to 55 percent. But he will always be remembered for his finals record with seven wins from eight games for two premierships To commemorate his legacy as Adelaide's first premiership coach, the club named their annual best and fairest award the Malcolm Blight Medal. Blight was once again replaced by Gary Ayres, this time as Adelaide Football Club senior coach.

St Kilda Football Club senior coach (2001): Promising start, disappointing end
After finishing at Adelaide, Blight decided to retire from football and moved to Queensland. St Kilda officials visited him there during 2000 and overcame his reluctance to coach St Kilda in 2001 with a $1 million offer. Blight then replaced Tim Watson as the St Kilda Football Club senior coach.  Blight was however sacked after Round 15 during the 2001 season with three wins and twelve losses sitting at fourteenth (third-last) on the ladder. Blight was then replaced by Grant Thomas as caretaker senior coach for the rest of the 2001 season, who was eventually appointed as full-time senior coach. Blight's famous humiliation of the players by making them stay on Colonial Stadium after a Round 10 loss to Melbourne and again after a Round 15 loss to Adelaide in his final game as coach, highlighted the worsening relation between the coach, players and club supporters. Some years later the former president of St Kilda, Rod Butterss, questioned Blight's commitment to the club during his tenure. Blight responded memorably from his position as media commentator with Channel Ten, saying: 

However, as early as February 2003, Butterss had admitted that his appointment of Blight as coach was "an error." In August 2017, Butterss further admitted that he'd made crucial decisions (including the Blight saga) while under the influence of drugs and alcohol during his tenure at the club.

Blight coached St Kilda Football club in 2001 to a total of 15 games with three wins and twelve losses to a winning percentage of 20 percent.

Involvement at Gold Coast Suns
In 2009, Blight joined the Board of directors at the 17th AFL team, Gold Coast Suns.

In July 2012, Gold Coast Suns announced that Blight had stepped down from the board to take up a part-time advisory role as director of coaching under Gold Coast Suns senior coach Guy McKenna, following a similar growing trend where former coaches (among them Mark Williams, Dean Laidley and Mark Harvey) have been employed as advisors to other senior coaches. Blight left the Gold Coast Suns at the end of the 2015 season, after he was relieved of his duties as director of coaching position at Gold Coast. Blight and the club came to a mutual agreement that the position had become redundant after the appointment of Rodney Eade as senior coach of the Gold Coast Suns at the start of the year and season.

Blight's Squad of Champions
Looking back over his coaching career, Blight nominated in June 2012 a team of the greatest 22 players that he had coached, plus four emergencies. This was how the team looked:

The four emergencies named were: Peter Caven (Adelaide), Kane Johnson (Adelaide), Peter Riccardi (Geelong) and Tony Modra (Adelaide).

Media career
Blight continued his football involvement through the media. He commentated for the Seven Network during his hiatus from coaching in 1988, 1995-1996 and 2000, and also co-hosted Talking Footy with fellow commentator Bruce McAvaney and journalist Mike Sheahan. After finishing up as a coach, Blight commentated for Network Ten's television coverage.

In 2006 Blight appeared in a Toyota Legendary Moment ad recreating his goal after the siren against Carlton.

He also wrote football-related articles for the Sunday Mail.

Blight is known for his dislike of the practice of players using grubber kicks when attempting to score a goal, due to the lack of control and unpredictability of the bounce.
He is currently the cohost of Sportsday SA on FIVEaa in Adelaide with David Wildy.

Statistics

Playing statistics

|-
|- style="background-color: #EAEAEA"
! scope="row" style="text-align:center" | 1974
|style="text-align:center;"|
| 15 || 15 || 17 || 18 || 200 || 60 || 260 || 91 ||  || 1.1 || 1.2 || 13.3 || 4.0 || 17.3 || 6.1 || 
|-
|style="text-align:center;background:#afe6ba;"|1975†
|style="text-align:center;"|
| 15 || 18 || 14 || 18 || 187 || 63 || 250 || 69 ||  || 0.8 || 1.1 || 11.0 || 3.7 || 14.7 || 4.1 || 
|- style="background-color: #EAEAEA"
! scope="row" style="text-align:center" | 1976
|style="text-align:center;"|
| 15 || 23 || 35 || 29 || 378 || 102 || 480 || 159 ||  || 1.5 || 1.3 || 16.4 || 4.4 || 20.9 || 6.9 || 
|-
|style="text-align:center;background:#afe6ba;"|1977†
|style="text-align:center;"|
| 15 || 24 || 24 || 33 || 415 || 115 || 530 || 127 ||  || 1.0 || 1.4 || 17.3 || 4.8 || 22.1 || 5.3 || 
|- style="background-color: #EAEAEA"
! scope="row" style="text-align:center" | 1978
|style="text-align:center;"|
| 15 || 24 || 77 || 51 || 361 || 69 || 430 || 136 ||  || 3.2 || 2.1 || 15.0 || 2.9 || 17.9 || 5.7 || 
|-
! scope="row" style="text-align:center" | 1979
|style="text-align:center;"|
| 15 || 19 || 60 || 27 || 275 || 67 || 342 || 102 ||  || 3.2 || 1.4 || 14.5 || 3.5 || 18.0 || 5.4 || 
|- style="background-color: #EAEAEA"
! scope="row" style="text-align:center" | 1980
|style="text-align:center;"|
| 15 || 20 || 44 || 29 || 282 || 90 || 372 || 87 ||  || 2.2 || 1.5 || 14.1 || 4.5 || 18.6 || 4.4 || 
|-
! scope="row" style="text-align:center" | 1981
|style="text-align:center;"|
| 15 || 15 || 70 || 45 || 206 || 31 || 237 || 79 ||  || bgcolor="DD6E81"| 4.7 || bgcolor="DD6E81"| 3.0 || 13.7 || 2.1 || 15.8 || 5.3 || 
|- style="background-color: #EAEAEA"
! scope="row" style="text-align:center" | 1982
|style="text-align:center;"|
| 15 || 20 || bgcolor="DD6E81"| 103 || 66 || 233 || 43 || 276 || 112 ||  || bgcolor="DD6E81"| 5.2 || bgcolor="DD6E81"| 3.3 || 11.7 || 2.2 || 13.8 || 5.6 || 
|- class="sortbottom"
! colspan=3| Career
! 178
! 444
! 316
! 2537
! 640
! 3177
! 962
! 
! 2.5
! 1.8
! 14.3
! 3.6
! 17.8
! 5.4
! 
|}

Head coaching record

See also
After the siren kicks in Australian rules football
Robert Walls

References

External links
 
 
 
 Profile at kangaroos.com.au
 AFL: Hall of Fame
 SANFL Hall of Fame Profile
 
 

North Melbourne Football Club players
North Melbourne Football Club Premiership players
Woodville Football Club players
Coleman Medal winners
Brownlow Medal winners
Syd Barker Medal winners
Magarey Medal winners
Adelaide Football Club coaches
Adelaide Football Club Premiership coaches
Geelong Football Club coaches
North Melbourne Football Club coaches
St Kilda Football Club coaches
Woodville Football Club coaches
Australian rules football commentators
Members of the Order of Australia
All-Australians (1953–1988)
Australian Football Hall of Fame inductees
South Australian State of Origin players
Australian people of Cornish descent
Australian rules footballers from Adelaide
South Australian Football Hall of Fame inductees
1950 births
Living people
Two-time VFL/AFL Premiership players
Two-time VFL/AFL Premiership coaches